This is the discography for American rhythm and blues musician Anthony Hamilton.

Albums
Studio albums

Christmas albums

Compilation albums

Singles

Featured singles

Other contributions

References

Discographies of American artists
Jazz discographies